Lake Kaulime is a lake of Malawi. It is 8 km west of Chisti, Malawi and is located inside Nyika National Park.

Kaulime
Geography of Northern Region, Malawi